The non-marine mollusks of Taiwan are a part of the molluscan fauna of Taiwan. A number of species of non-marine mollusks are found in the wild in Taiwan.

Summary table of number of species

Land gastropods 

Assimineidae
 Assiminea nitida (Pease, 1864) – on Pratas Island

Truncatellidae
 Truncatella guerinii A. & J. B. Villa, 1841 – on Pratas Island
 Truncatella pfeifferi Martens, 1860 – on Pratas Island

Ellobiidae
 Melampus castanea (Mühlfeld, 1818) – on Pratas Island
 Melampus nuxeastaneus Kuroda, 1949 – on Pratas Island
 Melampus flavus (Gmelin, 1791) – on Pratas Island
 Melampus sculptus (Pfeiffer, 1855) – on Pratas Island
 Melampus taeniolatus (Hombron & Jacquinot, 1854) – on Pratas Island
 Tralia malanastoma Garrett, 1873 – on Pratas Island

Veronicellidae
 Laevicaulis alte (Férussac, 1821) – on Pratas Island

Clausiliidae
 Hemiphaedusa (Hemizaptyx) antuensis chichiensis Nordsieck, 2005
 Hemiphaedusa (Hemizaptyx) hemmeni Nordsieck, 2005
 Hemiphaedusa (Hemizaptyx) hemmeni yucola Nordsieck, 2005
 Hemiphaedusa (Hemizaptyx) longiplicata Nordsieck, 2005
 Thaumatoptyx costellata Nordsieck, 2005
 Thaumatoptyx gonyptyx lacuphila Nordsieck, 2005
 Thaumatoptyx uraniscoptyx diploptyx Nordsieck, 2005

Pupillidae
 Gastrocopta pediculus (Shuttleworth, 1852) – on Pratas Island 
 Gastrocopta pediculus ovatula (Moellendorff, 1890)
 Gastrocopta servilis (Gould, 1843) – on Pratas Island

Vertiginidae
 Nesopupa yamagutii Kuroda, 1941 – on Pratas Island, endemic to Taiwan
 Vertigo sp. – on Pratas Island

Succineidae
 Succinea erythrophana Ancey, 1883 – on Pratas Island

Subulinidae
 Lamellaxis gracilis (Hutton, 1834) – on Pratas Island
 Lamellaxis turgidulum (Heude, 1841) – on Pratas Island
 Paropeas achatinaceum (Pfeiffer, 1846) – on Pratas Island
 Subulina octona (Bruguière, 1792) – on Pratas Island

Achatinidae
 Achatina fulica Bowdich, 1822 – exotic species, on Pratas Island

Streptaxidae
 Indoennea bicolor (Hutton, 1834) – on Pratas Island
 Elma Adams, 1866

Helicarionidae
 Liardetia yaeyamensis (Pilsbry, 1901) – on Pratas Island

Gastrodontidae
 Zonitoides arboreus (Say, 1816) – on Pratas Island

Philomycidae
 Meghimatium burchi Tsai & Wu, 2008
 Meghimatium bilineatum
 Meghimatium fruhstorferi (Collinge, 1901)
 Meghimatium pictum
 Meghimatium rugosum

Arionidae
 Arion distinctus Mabille, 1868

Agriolimacidae
 Deroceras laeve (O. F. Müller, 1774)

Bradybaenidae
 Acusta tourannensis (Souleyet, 1842) – on Pratas Island
 Bradybaena similaris (Férussac, 1822) – on Pratas Island
 Aegista subchinensis
 Aegista mackensii
 Aegista impexa

Camaenidae
 Camaena cicatricosa cicatricosa (Müller, 1774)

Bivalvia
Unionidae
 Unio douglasiae taiwanicus (Pilsbry, 1905)
 Cristaria tenuis (Gray, 1833) [=Cristaria discoidea (Lea, 1834)]
 Sinanodonta woodiana (Lea, 1834)

See also
 List of marine molluscs of Taiwan

Lists of molluscs of surrounding countries:
 List of non-marine molluscs of China
 List of non-marine molluscs of Hong Kong
 List of non-marine molluscs of the Philippines
 List of non-marine molluscs of Japan

References

External links 
 Sinica.edu: Shells of Taiwan
   Chen W. D. & Wu S.-K. (2011). Freshwater Molluscs of Taiwan. 321 pp. .
 Nordsieck H. (2005). "New taxa of Phaedusinae and Garnieriinae from mainland China and Taiwan (Gastropoda: Stylommatophora: Clausiliidae)". Archiv für Molluskenkunde 134: 23–52. .

 Non marine moll

Molluscs
Taiwan
Taiwan